Hannah Neumann (born 3 April 1984) is a German politician of the Alliance 90/The Greens who has been serving as a Member of the European Parliament since 2019.

Early life and education
Neumann studied media studies at TU Ilmenau from 2002 until 2007 and political science at Free University of Berlin from 2008 until 2012. During her studies, she spent a year abroad at Ateneo de Manila University from 2004 until 2005.

Career

Neumann worked as legislative assistant to Tom Koenigs (2013-2014) and as chief of staff to Omid Nouripour (2014-2016) in the German Bundestag. From 2018 until 2019, she was an associate fellow at the German Council on Foreign Relations (DGAP).

Neumann has been a Member of the European Parliament since the 2019 European elections. She has since been serving on the Subcommittee on Human Rights and the Subcommittee on Security and Defence. In addition, she serves as substitute in the Committee on Foreign Affairs. In 2022, she joined the Committee of Inquiry to investigate the use of Pegasus and equivalent surveillance spyware.   

In addition to her committee assignments, Neumann chairs the Parliament's delegation for relations with the Arab Peninsula. She is also a member of the European Parliament Intergroup on Anti-Racism and Diversity, the European Parliament Intergroup on LGBT Rights and the European Parliament Intergroup on Anti-Corruption.

In the negotiations to form a so-called traffic light coalition of the Social Democratic Party (SPD), the Green Party and the Free Democratic Party (FDP) following the 2021 federal elections, Neumann was part of her party's delegation in the working group on foreign policy, defence, development cooperation and human rights, co-chaired by Heiko Maas, Omid Nouripour and Alexander Graf Lambsdorff.

Other activities
 German Council on Foreign Relations (DGAP), Member of the Presidium (since 2019)
 Berghof Foundation, Member of the Advisory Council

Political positions
In May 2021, Neumann joined a group of 39 mostly Green Party lawmakers from the European Parliament who in a letter urged the leaders of Germany, France and Italy not to support Arctic LNG 2, a $21 billion Russian Arctic liquefied natural gas (LNG) project, due to climate change concerns.

References

External links

 
 

1984 births
Living people
MEPs for Germany 2019–2024
21st-century women MEPs for Germany
Alliance 90/The Greens MEPs